Tuominen is a Finnish surname. Notable people with the surname include:

 Arvo Tuominen (1894–1981), Finnish politician and journalist
 Erkki Tuominen (1914–1975), Finnish politician
 Henri Tuominen (born 1991), Finnish ice hockey player
 Jaakko Tuominen (1944–2001), Finnish hurdler
 Jani Tuominen (born 1971), Finnish ice hockey player
 Jasse Tuominen (born 1995), Finnish football player
 Joni Tuominen (born 1982), Finnish ice hockey player
 Kaarlo Tuominen (1908–2006), Finnish steeplechase runner
 Minttu Tuominen (born 1990), Finnish ice hockey player
 Oiva Tuominen (1908–1976), Finnish fighter ace and a Mannerheim Cross knight
 Olli Tuominen (born 1979), Finnish squash player
 Saara Tuominen (born 1986), Finnish ice hockey player
 Visa Tuominen (born 1983), Finnish figure skater

See also
13994 Tuominen, asteroid

Finnish-language surnames